Rzayev or Rzaev (Russian: Рзаев) is an Azerbaijani masculine surname, its feminine counterpart is Rzayeva or Rzaeva. It may refer to
Anar Rzayev (born 1938), Azerbaijani writer, dramatist and film director
Dadash Rzayev, Minister of Defense of Azerbaijan 
Hagigat Rzayeva (1907–1969), Azerbaijani actress and singer 
Mushig Rzayev (born 1998), Russian football player 
Rail Rzayev (1945–2009), Commander of the Azerbaijani Air Force
Roida Rzayeva (born 1979), Azerbaijani philosopher 
Ruslan Rzayev (born 1998), Russian football player 
Vidadi Rzayev (born 1967), Azerbaijani football midfielder 

Azerbaijani-language surnames